The 2008 Skate America was the first event of six in the 2008–09 ISU Grand Prix of Figure Skating, a senior-level international invitational competition series. It was held at the Comcast Arena at Everett in Everett, Washington on October 23–26. Medals were awarded in the disciplines of men's singles, ladies' singles, pair skating, and ice dancing. Skaters earned points toward qualifying for the 2008–09 Grand Prix Final. The compulsory dance was the Viennese Waltz.

Schedule
All times are Pacific Daylight Time (UTC-7).

 Friday, October 24
 3:05 p.m. – Ice dancing: Compulsory dance
 7:35 p.m. – Pair skating: Short program
 9:05 p.m. – Men's singles: Short program
 Saturday, October 25
 2:08 p.m. – Ice dancing: Original dance
 3:50 p.m. – Pair skating: Free skating
 7:08 p.m. – Ladies' singles: Short program
 9:10 p.m. – Men's singles: Free skating
 Sunday, October 26
 11:08 a.m. – Ice dancing: Free dance
 1:07 p.m. – Ladies' singles: Free skating
 5:00 p.m. – Exhibition of Champions

Results

Men

Ladies

Pairs

Ice dancing

External links

 
 Official site
 
 

Skate America, 2008
Skate America
Sports in Everett, Washington
Skate America